Roberto Chapula de la Mora (6 November 1955 – 2 May 2022) was a Mexican politician. A member of the Ecologist Green Party of Mexico, he served in the Congress of Colima from 2000 to 2003, 2006 to 2009, and 2021 to 2022. He was assassinated in Colima City on 2 May 2022, at the age of 66.

References

1955 births
2022 deaths
21st-century Mexican politicians
Members of the Congress of Colima
Ecologist Green Party of Mexico politicians
Assassinated Mexican politicians
Deaths by firearm in Mexico
Politicians from Colima City